Göppingen (Swabian: Geppenge or Gebbenga) is a town in southern Germany, part of the Stuttgart Region of Baden-Württemberg. It is the capital of the district Göppingen. Göppingen is home to the toy company Märklin, and it is the birthplace of football player Jürgen Klinsmann. It also hosts the headquarters of TeamViewer AG.

Geography
Göppingen is situated at the bottom of the Hohenstaufen mountain, in the valley of the river Fils. The districts of Göppingen are Bartenbach, Bezgenriet, Faurndau, Göppingen, Hohenstaufen, Holzheim, Jebenhausen and Maitis.

History 
Tradition holds that the city was founded by an Alemannic leader called Geppo sometime in the 3rd or 4th century. A disastrous fire on August 25, 1782 destroyed most of the town, but it was immediately rebuilt. Industrialisation during the 19th century made the area into a centre of industry. The importance of such industry is still seen in the town in the present day in companies such as Märklin and Schuler.

Jewish community
Göppingen and the nearby village of Jebenhausen were home to a thriving Jewish community from 1777 until the Second World War.  In 1777, the Baron von Liebenstein issued a "Letter of Protection" granting Elias Gutmann and other Jews permission to settle in Jebenhausen.  The community grew and peaked in the mid-1800s, with the population center shifting from Jebenhausen to Göppingen and a substantial emigration of Jewish families to America by the late 19th Century. The Göppingen synagogue, constructed in 1881, was destroyed during the Kristallnacht from 9–10 November 1938. Detailed records of the communities were collected by Rabbi Dr. Aron Tänzer, who served the community from 1907-1937, and who was also a driving force behind the establishment of the secular city library in Göppingen. A comprehensive Jewish community history, Die Geschichte der Juden in Jebenhausen und Göppingen, was first produced by Tänzer in 1927, on the 150th anniversary of the settlement of Jebenhausen, and re-released in 1988 by the city of Göppingen with updated material added by Karl-Heinz Ruess.  The Jewish Museum in Jebenhausen, opened in 1992, documents and preserves the history of the Jewish community of Jebenhausen and Göppingen.

Cooke Barracks
In 1930, a civilian air field was built north of Göppingen.  This was acquired by the Luftwaffe (German Air Force) in 1935 and expanded into Fliegerhorst Kaserne.  From 1945 through 1949, displaced persons and refugees were housed in the kaserne.  In 1949, it was renamed Cooke Barracks in honor of Charles H. Cooke, Jr. who had been posthumously awarded the Silver Star and Soldier's Medal for gallantry in action.  In late 1950, the VII Corps (US) had been reactivated in Stuttgart and U.S. Army units began to be stationed at Cooke Barracks.  The barracks began to be expanded and was used as the 28th Infantry Division headquarters.  The 28th Infantry was redesignated as the 9th Infantry Division (United States) in 1954 and was replaced by the 8th Infantry Division in 1956.  They were then replaced by the 4th Armored Division in 1957, which was redesignated as the 1st Armored Division in 1971 and moved to Hindenburg Kaserne in Ansbach in 1972.  The 1st Infantry Division (Forward) moved from Augsburg in 1972 until they were deactivated in 1991.  Cooke Barracks was returned to the German government in 1992.  The barracks were again used to house refugees for some time, then returned to civilian use.

Mayors
 1819–1824: Viktor David Keller
 1824–1858: Ludwig Heinrich Widmann
 1858–1881: Georg Christian Philipp Friedrich Seefried (1814-1881)
 1881–1908: Gottlob Friedrich Allinger
 1908–1919: Julius Keck (1869-1924)
 1919–1933: Otto Hartmann
 1933–1945: Erich Pack
 1945–1954: Christian Eberhard (1886-1973)
 1954–1980: Herbert König 
 1981–1996: Hans Haller 
 1997–2004: Reinhard Frank (born 1955), (CDU)
 2005-2021: Guido Till (born 1955), (SPD/independent/CDU)
 since 2021: Alexander Maier (born 1991), (Greens)

Sport
Local sports club Frisch Auf Göppingen currently in the German first team handball men's top division Handball-Bundesliga.

Media 
Göppingen has its own daily newspaper called "Neue Württembergische Zeitung". The "Stuttgarter Zeitung" also has a local editorial office in Göppingen. In addition, Göppingen has its own local TV station, the "Filstalwelle". It can be received in the local cable network and via the web. Göppingen also has "Radio Fips" which is a radio station operated by a non-profit association.

Twin towns – sister cities

Göppingen is twinned with:
 Foggia, Italy (1971)
 Klosterneuburg, Austria (1971)
 Pessac, France (2000)
 Sonneberg, Germany (1990)

Notable people
 Michael Maestlin (1550–1631), mathematician and astronomer

 Friedrich Christoph Oetinger (1702–1782), theologian, leading pietist
 August Ludwig Schott (1751–1787), lawyer and university professor
 Eduard Fuchs (1870–1940), scholar, writer, political activist
 Hugo Borst (1881–1967), private art collector and patron of the arts
 Adolf Kurz (1888–1959), wrestler
 Karl Aberle (1901–1963), publisher and politician (SPD), member of Parliament, co-editor of the Neue Württembergische Zeitung
 Hans Robert Jauss (1921–1997), literary scholar and linguist
 Peter Häberle (born 1934), constitutional lawyer
 F. W. Bernstein (born 1938), poet, artist and satirist
 Frieder Birzele (born 1940), politician (SPD), former member of Landtag 
 Otto Hauser (born 1952), politician (CDU), Member of the Bundestag, parliamentary secretary and government spokesman
 Brigitte Russ-Scherer (born 1956), jurist, 1999-2007 mayor of Tübingen (SPD)
 Charles Pelkey (born 1958), journalist, lawyer and Democratic Whip of the Wyoming House of Representatives from 2015 to 2021.
 Jürgen Klinsmann (born 1964), footballer, national coach of German football team (2004-2006)
 Michael Kraus (born 1983), handball player
Annica Schuler (born 2005)

References

External links

 Official website
 

Towns in Baden-Württemberg
Göppingen (district)
Württemberg